Anderiesen is a Dutch patronymic surname (son of Andries). Notable people with the surname include:

 Henk Anderiesen (1898–1980), Dutch footballer
 Wim Anderiesen Sr. (1903–1944), Dutch footballer
 Wim Anderiesen Jr. (1931–2017), Dutch footballer

See also 
 Andriessen

References 

Dutch-language surnames
Patronymic surnames